Christ Lutheran Academy could mean:

 Christ Lutheran Academy (Plainfield, Illinois)
 Christ Lutheran Academy (Pleasant Prairie, Wisconsin)

See also
 Lutheran High School (disambiguation)